The Jacksonville Stingrays were a professional basketball franchise based in Jacksonville, Florida in 1992. The team played its inaugural season in the World Basketball League before the league folded.

The Stingrays played its home games at the Jacksonville Coliseum.

Sources

The Stingrays were owned by Terry May an insurance executive from Youngstown Ohio.  The team was coached by Head Coach Eric Dennis and included players like Cory Gaines who went on to coach in the WNBA, Danny Person Jacksonville University star and Eldridge Recasner NBA 3 point Shoot out Champ.  Other college greats and former NBA stars like World B. Free went on to play professionally around the world. Although the team had a winning record of 21 wins 9 loses the team was forced to cease operation soon after the All-Star break due to the entire league folding after five years in existence. 

World Basketball League teams
Basketball teams in Florida
1992 establishments in Florida
1992 disestablishments in Florida
Basketball teams established in 1992
Basketball teams disestablished in 1992
Sports teams in Jacksonville, Florida